Synchiropus corallinus, the exclamation point dragonet, is a species of fish in the family Callionymidae, the dragonets. It is found in the  Pacific Ocean.

References

corallinus
Fish of the Pacific Ocean
Taxa named by Charles Henry Gilbert
Fish described in 1905